The 2020–21 season was Željezničar's 100th in existence and their 21st season in the Premier League BH. Besides competing in the domestic league, the team also competed in the National Cup and in the UEFA Europa League qualifiers as well.

The club finished on 7th place in the league, while it got knocked out from the cup in the quarter-finals.

Season review

June
On 5 June, Željezničar announced the signing of 24-year-old Ante Blažević.

On 6 June, Željezničar and Frane Ikić negotiated a one-year contract extension lasting until June 2021, with an option for one more year.

On 12 June, Željezničar and Mont Inženjering signed a partnership agreement.

On 18 June, Željezničar announced the departure of Semir Dacić, Vernes Karavdić and Mirza Šubo.

On 20 June, Željezničar started with the pre-season for the upcoming season.

On 23 June, Željezničar announced the signing of 24-year-old Anel Hajrić.

On 26 June, Željezničar announced the signing of 23-year-old Luka Juričić.

On 27 June, Željezničar announced the signing of 35-year-old Samir Bekrić.

July
On 8 July, Željezničar announced the signing of 34-year-old Irfan Fejzić.

On 15 July, Željezničar announced the loan of 21-year-old Ivan Milićević from Lokomotiva for the upcoming 2020–21 season.

August
On 5 August, Željezničar extended their sponsorship agreement with Milkos and Brajlović.

On 15 August, Željezničar extended their sponsorship agreement with Sarajevo osiguranje.

On 20 August, Željezničar extended their sponsorship agreement with Adriatic osiguranje.

On 24 August, Željezničar announced six players tested positive for COVID-19, amid its pandemic in Bosnia and Herzegovina.

On 26 August, Željezničar announced four more players and a coach tested positive for COVID-19.

September
On 4 September, Željezničar announced the signing of 21-year-old Vedran Vrhovac.

On 4 September, Željezničar and Garden City Konjic signed a sponsorship agreement.

On 7 September, Željezničar announced that all the players, coaches and club staff tested negative for COVID-19.

On 24 September, Željezničar extended their sponsorship agreement with Hidroinvest.

October
On 5 October, Željezničar and Cracovia completed the transfer of Damir Sadiković.

On 7 October, Željezničar extended their sponsorship agreement with PAK Centar.

On 26 October, Željezničar extended their sponsorship agreement with Amko Komerc.

November
On 23 November, Željezničar's chairman of the board Admir Džubur died of complications caused by COVID-19.

December
On 17 December, Željezničar announced the departure of Anel Hajrić.

On 18 December, Željezničar announced the departure of Nermin Jamak.

On 22 December, Željezničar extended their sponsorship agreement with Sarajevski kiseljak.

January
On 14 January, Željezničar and Boluspor completed the transfer of Haris Hajdarević.

On 23 January, Željezničar announced that businessman Samir Cerić had become the new club chairman of the board.

On 26 January, Željezničar and Media Market signed a partnership agreement.

On 30 January, Željezničar announced the loan of 22-year-old Jasmin Čeliković from Rijeka for the remainder of the 2020–21 season.

February
On 3 February, Željezničar and Mustafa Mujezinović negotiated a one-year contract extension lasting until June 2022.

On 4 February, Željezničar extended their sponsorship agreement with ELPI Comerc and Eko sir Puđa.

On 16 February, Željezničar and Siniša Stevanović negotiated a one-and-a-half-year contract extension lasting until June 2022.

On 23 February, Željezničar announced the signing of 20-year-old Luka Malić.

On 24 February, Željezničar announced the signings of 25-year-old Josip Bender and 28-year-old Sinan Ramović

March
On 2 March, Željezničar announced the loan of 21-year-old Anel Šabanadžović from AEK Athens for the remainder of the 2020–21 season, and the signing of 19-year-old Damir Hrelja.

On 18 March, Željezničar extended their sponsorship agreement with Mont Inženjering.

On 29 March, Željezničar and Blocksport signed a partnership agreement.

April
On 11 April, Željezničar announced the departure of manager Amar Osim.

On 14 April, Željezničar announced Blaž Slišković as the club's new manager.

May
On 8 May, Željezničar and Ghanaian Premier League club Medeama signed an official club partnership.

Squad information

Players

From Youth system

Disciplinary record
Includes all competitive matches and only players that got booked throughout the season. The list is sorted by shirt number, and then position.

Squad statistics

Goalscorers

Assists

Clean sheets

Transfers

Players in 

Total expenditure:  €0

Players out 

Total income:  €300,000
Net:  €300,000

Club

Coaching staff
{|
|valign="top"|

Other information

Sponsorship

|-

Competitions

Pre-season

Mid-season

Overall

Premijer Liga BiH

League table

Results summary

Results by round

Matches

Kup BiH

Round of 32

Round of 16

Quarter-finals

UEFA Europa League

First qualifying round

Notes

References

External links

FK Željezničar Sarajevo seasons
Zeljeznicar
2020–21 UEFA Europa League participants seasons